Once in a Blue Moon is the second album by German rock band Fool's Garden, released in 1993. It is the second and last album where singer Peter Freudenthaler and guitarist Volker Hinkel share lead vocals equally.

Track listing
 "Awakenings"
Lead vocals: Peter Freudenthaler
 "Man In A Cage"
Lead vocals: Volker Hinkel
 "Scared"
Lead vocals: Volker Hinkel
 "Careless Games"
Lead vocals: Volker Hinkel
 "Sandy"
Lead vocals: Peter Freudenthaler
 "One Way Out"
Lead vocals: Peter Freudenthaler & Volker Hinkel
 "Fall For Her"
Lead vocals: Volker Hinkel
 "Cry Baby Cry" (Lennon–McCartney)
Lead vocals: Volker Hinkel
 "Lena"
Lead vocals: Peter Freudenthaler
 "Tell Me Who I Am"
Lead vocals: Peter Freudenthaler
 "The Part Of The Fool"
Lead vocals: Volker Hinkel
 "You're Not Forgotten"
Lead vocals: Peter Freudenthaler
 "Spirit '91"
Lead vocals: Peter Freudenthaler
 "Once In A Blue Moon"
Lead vocals: Peter Freudenthaler

Singles
 "Spirit '91 / Once in a Blue Moon" (released as a double A-side in 1992)

Musicians
Peter Freudenthaler - vocals, keyboards
Volker Hinkel - vocals, guitars, programming
Roland Röhl - keyboards, backing vocals
Thomas Mangold - bass, backing vocals
Ralf Wochele - drums, backing vocals
Andy Gail - mandolin on "Careless Games"
Karin Jung, Nicole Freudenthaler, Claudia Tischer and Claudia Müller - backing vocals on "Awakenings" and "Spirit '91"

1993 albums
Fools Garden albums
Intercord albums